ARTEK was established in 2000 to educate Greenlandic and Danish students in Arctic Technology. In 2001, the first students started their education in Sisimiut, Greenland.

The centre will be run by Sanaartornermik Ilinniarfik (the Building and Construction School) in Sisimiut and the Technical University of Denmark (DTU) in Kongens Lyngby.

ARTEK was originally the abbreviation for Arctic Technology Centre, but from 2019 the name ARTEK Campus Sisimiut is used to describe DTU's campus in Sisimiut.

International activities 
In the later years, new and more international education opportunities have been added to the activities in Sisimiut. DTU's Arctic Semester was offered in Sisimiut for the first time in the spring of 2016, while the Nordic Master of Cold Climate Engineering was offered for the first time later the same year. Part of the Nordic Master in Cold Climate Engineering takes place in Sisimiut. 

The operation of ARTEK is a joint venture between KTI (Teknikimik Ilinniarfik/Tech College Greenland) in Sisimiut and DTU. ARTEK is funded by the Government of Greenland, private foundations and DTU.

References

External links
 Arctic Technology Centre

Universities in Denmark
Arctic research
Culture of the Arctic